Joe Dakota is a 1957 American Western film directed by Richard Bartlett and written by William Talman and Norman Jolley. The film stars Jock Mahoney, Luana Patten, Charles McGraw, Barbara Lawrence, Claude Akins, Lee Van Cleef, Anthony Caruso and Paul Birch. The film was released on October 27, 1957, by Universal Pictures.

Plot

Joe Dakota, a handsome, mysterious, and not exactly pleasant man, reaches Arborville, an isolated oil-seeking community in California. He is seeking an Indian scout who allegedly left the town after having sold real estate. Joe soon uncovers an unpleasant truth about the townsfolk and their oil well, which was built on the site of the Indian scout's farm. Also, a problem of attempted sexual assault is involved.

Cast        
Jock Mahoney as The Stranger
Luana Patten as Jody Weaver
Charles McGraw as Cal Moore
Barbara Lawrence as Myrna Weaver
Claude Akins as Aaron Grant
Lee Van Cleef as Adam Grant
Anthony Caruso as Marcus Vizzini
Paul Birch as Frank Weaver
George Dunn as Jim Baldwin
Steve Darrell as Sam Cook
Rita Lynn as Rosa Vizzini
Gregg Barton as Tom Jensen
Anthony Jochim as Claude Henderson
Jeane Wood as Bertha Jensen
Juney Ellis as Ethel Cook

References

External links
 

1957 films
American Western (genre) films
1957 Western (genre) films
Films directed by Richard Bartlett
Films scored by Henry Mancini
Films scored by Hans J. Salter
Films scored by Herman Stein
Universal Pictures films
1950s English-language films
1950s American films